Namhansanseong station is a railway station on Seoul Subway Line 8.

Vicinity
Exit 1: Way to Namhansanseong, Sangwon Elementary School, Seongnam Central Hospital, Eunhaeng 2-dong, Eunhaeng Market, Jungbu Elementary School
Exit 2: Geumgwang 2-dong, Geumgwang Market, Dandae Jugong APT, Samik APT, Seongnamdong Elementary School, Seongnam Phil Orthopedic Hospital, Way to Shingu University, Hyundai APT
Exit 3: Dandae-dong, Dandae-dong Office, Seongnamseo Middle School, Seongnam District Tax Office
Exit 4: Dandae Park, Dandae-dong Post Office, Dandae Elementary School, Seongnam Registration Office, Seongnam Court and Public Procecutor's Office, Yangji-dong Office, Way to Eulji University

Station layout

Seoul Metropolitan Subway stations
Railway stations opened in 1996
Metro stations in Seongnam